Naufahu Anitoni Tahi (born October 30, 1981) is a former American football fullback. He was signed by the Cincinnati Bengals as an undrafted free agent in 2006. He played college football at BYU. Tahi has also been a member of the Minnesota Vikings and the Jacksonville Jaguars.

Early years
At Granger High School in West Valley City, Utah, Tahi was named the USA Today Player of the Year for Utah as a senior. Tahi rushed for a total of 5,700 yards and set a state record as the all-time leader in rushing yards and for rushing touchdowns.

College career
Tahi attended Brigham Young University as a freshman in 1999 and led the team that year in rushing with 445 yards before taking a three-year leave for a mission in Jacksonville, Florida as he is a member of the Church of Jesus Christ of Latter-day Saints. Tahi returned to Brigham Young in 2003 and had a career-best 872 yards rushing from scrimmage as a senior and scored 8 touchdowns (6 rushing and 2 receiving).

Professional career

Cincinnati Bengals
Tahi was an undrafted free agent out of college and signed with the Cincinnati Bengals in 2006, but was released on final roster cuts and became a member of the team's practice squad.

Minnesota Vikings
Tahi signed with the Minnesota Vikings on November 22, 2006 to their active roster from Cincinnati's practice squad.

Tahi saw his first significant playing time in 2008.  During that year, he was listed number one on the Vikings depth chart and played several games at fullback blocking for Adrian Peterson as well as playing on special teams.  He also had 16 receptions for 37 yards, most of which came on one-yard dumpoffs in the flat, a favorite play of Brad Childress and the West Coast Offense playbook.

Tahi signed a $1.4 million offer sheet March 19 with the Cincinnati Bengals, but the Vikings matched the offer and re-signed him on March 27.

Tahi caught his first touchdown pass of his career on January 3, 2010 in a win against the New York Giants. He was re-signed to a one-year contract on April 13.

Jacksonville Jaguars
On May 6, 2012, Tahi signed with the Jacksonville Jaguars. On July 27, Tahi left Jaguars training camp for personal reasons and was released later that day.

Coaching career
Tahi has served as an offensive graduate assistant and offensive administrative assistant at Utah State University.

Personal life
Tahi was raised in a family that are natives of Tonga, but he was born in California before moving to Utah as a child. Tahi is cousins with former BYU and former NFL fullback Fui Vakapuna. After retiring from football in 2012 Tahi became the running backs coach for Granger High School in West Valley City, Utah.  Tahi graduated from Utah State University in 2016.  He is now serving as a Graduate Assistant for the Utah State Aggies.

References

External links
Jaguars Bio
BYU Bio
Utah State Bio

1981 births
Living people
People from Fontana, California
People from West Valley City, Utah
American people of Tongan descent
American Latter Day Saints
American football fullbacks
BYU Cougars football players
Cincinnati Bengals players
Minnesota Vikings players
Players of American football from Utah
Sportspeople from San Bernardino County, California
American Mormon missionaries in the United States
21st-century Mormon missionaries
Jacksonville Jaguars players
Players of American football from California